Faugères may refer to the following places in France:

 Faugères, Ardèche, a commune in the department of Ardèche
 Faugères, Hérault, a commune in the department of Hérault
 Faugères AOC, an Appellation d'origine contrôlée (AOC) wine from Faugères, Hérault